Room 2806: The Accusation is a 2020 French docuseries starring Nafissatou Diallo, Raphaëlle Bacqué and Élisabeth Guigou.

Cast 
 Nafissatou Diallo
 Raphaëlle Bacqué
 Élisabeth Guigou
 Paul Browne
 Ben Brafman
 William Taylor
 Olivier Blanchard
 Delrene Boyd
 Michael Osgood
 Larry McShane
 John Sheehan
 Laurent Azoulai
 Edward Jay Epstein
 Robert Davis
 Yves Magnan
 Alain Hamon
 Tristane Banon
 Robert Mooney
 Jack Lang
 Sonia Ossorio

Episodes

Release 
Room 2806: The Accusation was released on December 7, 2020, on Netflix.

References

External links
 
 

2020 French television series debuts
2020 French television series endings
Documentary television series about crime
French-language Netflix original programming
Netflix original documentary television series
Dominique Strauss-Kahn